The list of ship commissionings in 1941 includes a chronological list of all ships commissioned in 1941.


1941
 Ship commissionings